Agrawal is a Bania community found throughout Northern, Central and Western India.

This is a partial list of notable/famous people who use Agrawal (or other spelling variations) or an Agrawal gotra as their surname.

Arts
 

Purushottam Agrawal, writer and an ex-member of the Union Public Service Commission board
Vinita Agrawal, poet, editor and curator
Vasudeva Sharan Agrawala,  scholar of cultural history, Sanskrit and Hindi literature, numismatics, museology, art history, and recipient of the Sahitya Akademi Award
Bhagwan Das, Bharat Ratna (India's highest civilian award) awardee
Sita Ram Goel, historian, religious and political activist, writer, and publisher in the late twentieth century
S. N. Goenka, Padma Bhushan awardee, Vipassana meditation teacher
Bharatendu Harishchandra, Known as the "father of modern Hindi literature and Hindi theatre"

Civil servants

India
Lav Agarwal, face of India's fight against COVID-19 pandemic
D. P. Agrawal (academic), ex-chairman of the Union Public Service Commission (UPSC)
Subhash Chandra Garg, served as executive director in the World Bank, Economic Affairs Secretary and Finance Secretary of India 
Samant Goel, incumbent chief of the Research and Analysis Wing (RAW)
L. C. Goyal, ex-Union Home Secretary
Alok Mittal, inspector general, National Investigation Agency, Ministry of Home Affairs, Government of India
Vinay Mittal, ex-chairman of the Union Public Service Commission (UPSC)

United States
Rohit Aggarwala, Commissioner of the New York City Department of Environmental Protection

Corporate and business

Technology and Startups
 
 

Amit Agarwal, Country Head, Amazon India
Ritesh Agarwal, founder and CEO, Oyo Rooms
Bhavish Aggarwal, co-founder and CEO, Ola Cabs
Dinesh Agarwal, founder and CEO of IndiaMART 
Parag Agrawal, Ex-CEO of Twitter
Mohit Aron, founder and CEO of Cohesity, and co-founder and CTO of Nutanix
Anjali Bansal, founder, Avaana Capital
Binny Bansal,  co-founder, Flipkart
Jyoti Bansal, founder, AppDynamics
Mukesh Bansal, co-founder and former CEO, Myntra, co-founder and CEO Cure Fit
Rohit Bansal, co-founder and COO, Snapdeal 
Sachin Bansal, co-founder, Flipkart
Kavin Bharti Mittal, founder, hike Messenger
Anupam Mittal, founder, People Group Shaadi.com

Other businesses
 
 
Anil Agarwal, founder and chairman of Vedanta Limited 
Radhe Shyam Agarwal, co-founder and executive chairman of  Emami
Raamdeo Agrawal, co founder of Motilal Oswal Group
Sanjay Agarwal, MD & CEO of AU Small Finance Bank
Narendra Bansal, founder and owner of Intex Technologies
Naresh Goyal, founder, Jet Airways
Subhash Chandra, chairman of Essel Group
Binod Chaudhary, founder and owner of Chaudhary Group in Nepal
Sanjay Dalmia, chairman of Dalmia group
Rohtas Goel, founder of Omaxe
Qimat Rai Gupta,Founder and MD Havells
Om Prakash Jindal, founder and owner of the Jindal Group
Savitri Jindal, chairperson of JSW Steel
Lakshman Das Mittal, owner and chairman of Sonalika Group 
Lakshmi Mittal, chairman and CEO of ArcelorMittal
Shishir Bajoria, Chairman, SK Bajoria Group
Som Mittal, former president of NASSCOM
Sunil Mittal,  founder and chairman of Bharti Airtel 
B. K. Syngal, telecom executive

Entertainment industry
 
 
Aarthi Agarwal, actress
Ananya Agarwal, actress
Anirudh Agarwal, actor
Anu Aggarwal, actress
Divya Agarwal, actress
Kajal Aggarwal, actress
Mansi Aggarwal, choreographer
Nidhhi Agerwal, actress
Nisha Agarwal, actress
Ravi Agrawal (film producer), movie producer
Reena Aggarwal, actress
Sakshi Agarwal, actress
Shruti Agarwal, actress
Smita Bansal, actress
Sonia Agarwal, actress
Vivek Agrawal, movie producer
Devendra Goel, director and producer
Vipul Goyal, standup comedian
Aditi Mittal, standup comedian, actress, and writer

Law
 
 
Ajay Agarwal
Adish Aggarwala, jurist and the President of International Council of Jurists
Adarsh Kumar Goel, Supreme Court of India judge
Manju Goel, Delhi High Court Judge
Mahesh Mittal Kumar, Chairman of National Company Law Tribunal
Ajay Kumar Mittal, Chief Justice of Madhya Pradesh HIgh Court
Gita Mittal, Chief Justice of Jammu and Kashmir High Court
Rajesh Bindal, acting Chief Justice of Calcutta High Court

Politics and activists

Activists

 

Lala Lajpat Rai, Indian author, freedom fighter, and politician. He played a pivotal role in the Indian Independence movement.
Sir Ganga Ram Agrawal, civil engineer and architect known as "the father of modern-day Lahore"
Ajay Goyal
Ashok Singhal, president of Vishva Hindu Parishad and in charge of Ram Janmabhoomi movement

United States

 

Amit Agarwal, Solicitor General of Florida
Jay Goyal, member of the Ohio House of Representatives
Bobby Jindal, former governor of Louisiana

India

 

Arvind Kejriwal, Chief Minister of Delhi
Pawan Kumar Bansal, ex-Minister of Railways, Government of India
Piyush Goyal, Minister of Railways, Minister of Commerce & Industry, Government of India
Harsh Vardhan, Minister of Health and Family Welfare, Minister of Science and Technology, Minister of Earth Sciences, Government of India
Ashok Kumar Mittal, Rajya Sabha nominee, Chancellor of Lovely Professional University
Alok Agarwal
Amar Nath Agarwal
Bed Prakash Agarwal
Dhirendra Agarwal
Lakkhiram Agarwal
Mukund Lal Agrawal
Radha Mohan Das Agarwal
Rajesh Agarwal
Ramdas Agarwal
Satish Chandra Agarwal
Satya Prakash Agarwal
Sudarshan Agarwal
Tulsi Agarwal
Faqir Chand Aggarwal
Jai Bhagwan Aggarwal
Jai Parkash Aggarwal
Kapil Dev Aggarwal
Mira Aggarwal
Premchand Aggarwal
Umesh Aggarwal
Amar Agrawal
Brijmohan Agrawal
Devendra Agrawal
Dinesh Agrawal
Gaurishankar Agrawal
Gopaldas Shankarlal Agrawal
Jai Singh Agrawal
Jagannath Prasad Agrawal
Manoj Kumar Agrawal
Naresh Chandra Agrawal
Nitin Agrawal
Rajendra Agrawal
Vinod Agrawal (politician)
Sunil Bansal
Suresh Bansal
Vijay Bansal
Vinod Singh Bansal
Rajeev Bindal
Atul Garg
Jagan Prasad Garg
Mange Ram Garg
Parkash Chand Garg
Pukhraj Garg
Rajesh Garg
Sanjay Garg
Aseem Goel
Charti Lal Goel
Ram Niwas Goel
Shiv Charan Goel
Surendra Prakash Goel
Vijay Goel (politician)
Chandrakanta Goyal
Jai Bhagwan Goyal
Krishana Kumar Goyal
Mohinder Goyal 
Ved Prakash Goyal
Gopal Goyal Kanda
Kamini Jindal
Madan Mohan Mittal
Rajnish Kumar Mittal
Sat Paul Mittal
Sudhanshu Mittal
Ashok Singhal (politician)
Banwari Lal Singhal
Mangat Ram Singhal
Ram Kishan Singhal
Shailendra Mohan Singhal
Vijender Garg Vijay

Science and technology
 
 
Anant Agarwal, professor at Massachusetts Institute of Technology, founder and CEO of edX, founder and CTO of Tilera
Anil Agarwal, Padma Shri and Padma Bhushan awardee elected to the Global 500 Roll of Honour by the United Nations Environment Programme
Anurag Agrawal - director of the Institute of Genomics and Integrative Biology, Shanti Swarup Bhatnagar Prize awardee
G. D. Agrawal, Indian environmental engineer, religious leader, monk, environmental activist, professor, and Patron of Ganga Mahasabha founded by Madan Mohan Malviya in 1905
Girish Saran Agarwal, theoretical physicist, member of Royal Society UK
Manindra Agrawal, Deputy Director, Indian Institute of Technology, Kanpur, and Padma Shri awardee
Rakesh Agrawal (chemical engineer), Winthrop E. Stone Distinguished Professor of Chemical Engineering at Purdue University
Rakesh Agrawal (computer scientist), Technical Fellow at the Microsoft Search Labs, author of the 1st as well as 2nd highest cited of all papers in the fields of databases and data mining))
Ram Narain Agarwal, aerospace engineer; Padma Shri and Padma Bhushan awardee, considered the father of the Agni series of the ballistic missiles
Ramesh K. Agarwal, aviation pioneer; William Palm Professor of Engineering at Washington University
Anita Goel, Harvard-MIT physicist, physician; expert in nanobiophysics and nanotechnology; chairman and CEO of Nanobiosym; inventor of Gene-RADAR technology
Amit Goyal, scientist and inventor
Jai Pal Mittal, Fellow of Bhabha Atomic Research Centre and Distinguished Professor of Indian Institute of Technology, Mumbai
Amit Singhal, Google Fellow and head of Google Search team for 15 years

Sports
 
 
Asha Agarwal, Arjuna Award winner
Mayank Agarwal, Indian cricket team member
Sam Agarwal
Sandhya Agarwal, former captain of Indian women's cricket team
Subhash Agarwal, Arjuna Award winner, coach of India's national billiards team
Krishnan Kumar Aggarwal
Neha Aggarwal
Premlata Agrawal, first Indian woman to scale the Seven Summits
Vantika Agrawal, Woman Grandmaster (Chess)
Pushpendra Kumar Garg, Khel Ratna Award winner
Priyam Garg, captain of Indian U-19 Men's cricket team
Malaika Goel
Suresh Goel, Arjuna Award winner
Neha Goyal, Olympian
Sanjiwan Goyal
Ankur Mittal

See also 
Agrawal Jain

References 

Lists of Indian people by community